Daniel David Varela de Pina (born 7 August 1996) is a Cape Verdean amateur boxer. He competed in the men's flyweight event at the 2020 Summer Olympics.

References

External links
 

1996 births
Living people
Cape Verdean male boxers
Olympic boxers of Cape Verde
Boxers at the 2020 Summer Olympics
People from Santiago, Cape Verde